Tarne was a town of ancient Asia Minor, mentioned by Homer in the Iliad, and after him by Strabo; but Pliny the Elder knows Tarne only as a fountain of Mount Tmolus in ancient Lydia. Several ancient writers, such as Stephanus of Byzantium identified Atarneus with the Homeric place.

References

Populated places in ancient Turkey
Lost ancient cities and towns
Locations in the Iliad